The Mount Royal College Cougars were a junior "A" ice hockey team in the Alberta Junior Hockey League (AJHL) based in Calgary, Alberta, Canada.

History 
The Mount Royal College Cougars joined the AJHL for the 1970–71 season. The team played two seasons in the league before moving to the Alberta Colleges Athletics Conference following 1971–72 season.

Season-by-season record 

Note: GP = games played, W = wins, L = losses, OTL = overtime losses, Pts = points, GF = goals for, GA = goals against, PIM = penalties in minutes

See also 
 List of ice hockey teams in Alberta

References

External links 
Alberta Junior Hockey League

Defunct Alberta Junior Hockey League teams
Defunct ice hockey teams in Alberta
Defunct junior ice hockey teams in Canada
Ice hockey clubs established in 1970
1970 establishments in Alberta
1972 disestablishments in Alberta
Ice hockey clubs disestablished in 1972